Willie Edward Davis (born August 9, 1945 in Fairfield, Texas) is a retired professional basketball player.

College career
Davis attended North Texas State University, where he played college basketball.

Professional career
Davis was drafted in the seventh round of the 1968 NBA draft, by the Chicago Bulls, but he never played for them. He was the French League Best Scorer, in 1969. Davis spent one season in the American Basketball Association (ABA), as a member of the Texas Chaparrals, during the 1970–71 season.

External links

1945 births
Living people
American men's basketball players
Basketball players from Texas
Centers (basketball)
Chicago Bulls draft picks
Cincinnati Royals draft picks
North Texas Mean Green men's basketball players
People from Fairfield, Texas
Texas Chaparrals players
Wilmington Blue Bombers players